Morgan Bates (July 12, 1806 – March 2, 1874) was a politician from the U. S. state of Michigan.

Early life and publishing career
Bates was born near Glens Falls, New York.  He apprenticed as a printer at Sandy Hill and worked as a journeyman printer in Albany and other places.  In 1826, he published the Warren Gazette in Warren, Pennsylvania; Horace Greeley worked for him as a journeyman printer.  In 1828, he took charge of the Chautauqua Republican in Jamestown, New York.  In 1830, he went to New York City and helped Greeley launch the New Yorker (not the modern magazine).  In 1833, he was foreman with George Dawson in the office of the Detroit Advertiser, which he purchased in 1839, publishing it as a Whig paper until 1858.  Between 1849 and 1856 he made two trips to California via Cape Horn and started the first daily paper west of the Rocky Mountains, the Alta California in San Francisco.  In 1856, he became a clerk in the office of the Auditor General in Lansing, Michigan and served two years.  Then he moved to Traverse City, Michigan and started the Grand Traverse Herald, which he published for sixteen years.

Politics
Bates served as treasurer of Grand Traverse County from 1861 until his death in 1874, with the exception of a gap during the Andrew Johnson administration.  He was also a delegate to the 1868 Republican National Convention which nominated Ulysses S. Grant for U. S. President.

In 1868, Bates was elected the 19th lieutenant governor of Michigan and served from 1869–1873 under Governor Henry P. Baldwin.

Death
Bates died at the age of sixty-seven and is interred at Oakwood Cemetery in Traverse City.

References
Political Graveyard

External links

1806 births
1874 deaths
Lieutenant Governors of Michigan
Michigan lawyers
Michigan Republicans
Burials in Michigan
County treasurers in Michigan
Politicians from Glens Falls, New York
People from Hudson Falls, New York
Politicians from Jamestown, New York
People from Traverse City, Michigan
19th-century American politicians
19th-century American lawyers